, is a Japanese singer-songwriter. She was born in the Miyazaki Prefecture. She is signed to the record label A.S.A.B., an imprint of Avex.

Early life 
Miyuna has familiarized herself with rock, soul and pop music since she was a child. At a young age, she listened to Western music such as Whitney Houston and Michael Jackson that her parents played in the car, and Hibari Misora, that her grandmother liked.

Born with a natural husky voice, she could not sing like everyone else in elementary school music class. Because of this, she started voice training at the chorus club and a local music school.

In junior high school she broke her hip bone during track and field club activities. During the rehabilitation, she entered a singing audition and proceeded to the national level. Although she did not win the award, she caught the eye of musicians and began to attend vocal lessons and perform at events mainly in Fukuoka.

In the third year of junior high school, she started playing the electric-acoustic guitar.

Career
Miyuna found mainstream success with her first two singles, "Gamushara" and "Tenjou Tenge", which were used as opening and ending themes for the anime Black Clover. Her third single, "Boku to Kimi no Lullaby" was used as the ending theme for Fairy Tail, and the fourth single, "Yurareru", was used as the theme song for the 2019 Japanese remake of the Korean film Blind.
She continues to release demos for her songs on the independent Japanese music platform Eggs.

Discography

Mini-Albums
 2019.02.06: Me (眼) (Eye)
 2019.09.18: Yurareru (ユラレル)
 2020.10.28: reply

Singles
 2018.10.02: Gamushara (ガムシャラ) (5th opening theme for Black Clover)
 2018.11.13: Tenjou Tenge (天上天下) (5th ending theme for Black Clover)
 2019.04.14: Boku to Kimi no Lullaby (僕と君のララバイ) (3rd ending theme for the 3rd season of Fairy Tail)
 2019.07.24: Yurareru (ユラレル)
 2019.11.25: Color (ending theme for the PlayStation 4 game SD Gundam G Generation Cross Rays)
 2020.03.10: my life
 2020.06.01: Soleil (ソレイユ)
 2020.08.25: Ano Neko no Hanashi feat. Kubota Kai (あのねこの話 feat. クボタカイ)

Collaborations
 2020.04.08: Prism (AmPm feat. miyuna) (プリズム (AmPm feat.みゆな))

Demos
 2018.08.04: Fuwa Fuwa (ふわふわ)
 2018.09.16: Gamushara (ガムシャラ)
 2018.09.23: Tenjou Tenge (天上天下)
 2018.12.15: Zero-gatsu zero-nichi (0月0日)
 2019.03.24: Kuchinashi no Kotoba (くちなしの言葉)
 2019.03.30: Boku to Kimi no Lullaby (僕と君のララバイ)
 2019.05.23: Ikinakya (生きなきゃ)
 2019.05.24: Kan Biiru (缶ビール)
 2019.05.25: Onegai (願い)
 2019.07.12: Yurareru (ユラレル)
 2019.09.06: Guruguru (グルグル)
 2019.09.18: Yurareru (Studio Live) (ユラレル (Studio Live))
 2019.10.25: Susume (進め)

References

External links

 
 Eggs Artist Page

2002 births
Living people
Japanese women singer-songwriters
Japanese singer-songwriters
Japanese women pop singers
Japanese pop musicians
21st-century Japanese singers
21st-century Japanese women singers